Kilmore or Killmore (from the ) is a small village, townland and civil parish in County Armagh, Northern Ireland. It lies 2.5 miles (4 km) north of Richhill and within the Armagh City, Banbridge and Craigavon Borough Council area. It had a population of 190 people (74 households) in the 2011 Census.

Finds from the area include a 12th-century silver finger ring, a bone comb, fragments of a lignite bracelet, skeletal remains from fields surrounding the church and an early 10th-century copper alloy and crutch-headed pin now in the British Museum.

History

The Troubles
For more information see The Troubles in Kilmore, County Armagh, which includes a list of incidents in Kilmore during The Troubles resulting in two or more fatalities.

People
Thomas Preston, an Irish scientist from the 19th century who published works on heat & light. He also discovered the Zeeman Effect.

Sport
The nearest GAA club to Kilmore is Ballyhegan Davitts GAC, one of the oldest clubs in County Armagh.

Education
 St. Oliver Plunkett's Primary School

See also
List of towns and villages in Northern Ireland
List of civil parishes of County Armagh

References

Ulster Guide 1935

Villages in County Armagh
Townlands of County Armagh
Civil parishes of County Armagh
Culdees